Jeremy V. R. Hearder (born late 1930s) is an Australian author and historian, and former diplomat and public servant.

He was Australia's first high commissioner to Zimbabwe (1980–84) and is the author of the biography Jim Plim: Ambassador Extraordinary (2015).

Life and career 
Born in the late 1930s, Hearder was the son of one of three founders of the Australian Secret Intelligence Service, former British army officer Roblin Hearder. The younger Hearder joined the Department of External Affairs in January 1959.

In 1980, Hearder was appointed the first High Commissioner to Zimbabwe, shortly after Zimbabwe's independence. Retaining his High Commissioner position, in 1981 Hearder was accredited High Commissioner to Botswana, and in 1982 he was accredited also as Australia's first Ambassador to Mozambique. In 1984, after his posting in Harare came to an end, Hearder moved to Suva, Fiji, to take up a second High Commissioner posting.

Hearder was Consul-General in Chicago from 1988 to 1991, responsible for promoting Australian trade and investment to America's mid-west.

In 2015, Hearder launched his book, Jim Plim: Ambassador Extraordinary, a biography of diplomat James Plimsoll whom Hearder had worked with in the late 1970s in Brussels. Reviewing the book, Philip Flood wrote that Hearder had done justice to Plimsoll's career as a great Australian ambassador.

Works

References

Living people
Year of birth missing (living people)
Place of birth missing (living people)
Australian historians
University of Melbourne alumni
1930s births
High Commissioners of Australia to Zimbabwe
High Commissioners of Australia to Botswana
High Commissioners of Australia to Fiji
High Commissioners of Australia to Tuvalu
Consuls-General of Australia in Chicago